Stretch is a nickname of:

People 

 Stretch Johnson (1915–2002), American tap dancer and social activist
 Seantavius Jones (born 1992), American football player
 Stretch Kontelj (born 1961), Australian politician
 Alvin Martin (born 1958), English footballer
 Willie McCovey (1938–2018), American baseball player
 Stretch Miller (1910–1972), American sports broadcaster 
 Stretch Murphy (1907–1992), American basketball player
 Jake Pelkington (1916–1982), American basketball player
 Jack Phillips (first baseman) (1921–2009), American baseball player
 Howie Schultz (1922–2009), American baseball and basketball player
 Ron Tompkins (born 1944), American baseball pitcher
 Augie Vander Meulen (1909–1993), American basketball player

Fictional characters 

 Stretch Cunningham, a recurring character in the TV series All in the Family
 Stretch Snodgrass, in the radio/TV series Our Miss Brooks

See also 

Lists of people by nickname